Typhoon Warren, known in the Philippines as Typhoon Huaning, struck the Philippines and China during July 1988. An area of disturbed weather developed within the vicinity of the Caroline Islands during the second week of July. A tropical depression developed southeast of Guam on July 12, and on the next day, intensified into a tropical storm. Tracking generally west-northwest, Warren deepened into a typhoon on July 14. The storm subsequently entered a period of rapid intensification, commencing with Warren reaching its highest intensity on July 16. The following evening, the typhoon brushed Luzon, resulting in a weakening trend, although Warren was still a typhoon when it made landfall near Shantou. Warren rapidly dissipated inland.

Across the Philippines, 3,560 houses were damaged and an additional 21,329 were destroyed, displacing 19,224 families. Six people were killed and damage was estimated at US$11.4 million. In Hong Kong, severe flooding occurred, especially in low-lying areas, several trees were downed, and there were reports of five landslides. There, 12 people suffered injuries and one individual was injured. In Shantou, six people perished, 106 others suffered injuries, 4,500 homes were destroyed, and 38,000 homes received damage. Throughout Guangdong Province, 150,000 homes were damaged and 13,000 others were destroyed. Overall, 17 people lost their lives, 153 people were wounded, and damage was estimated at $270 million.

Meteorological history

Typhoon Warren developed from an area of disorganized convection in the eastern Caroline Islands that was first noted by the Joint Typhoon Warning Center (JTWC) on July 11. An increase in organization and improved upper-level outflow promoted the JTWC to raise its development chances. At 16:00 UTC on July 12, the JTWC classified the system as a tropical depression. On the morning of July 13, the depression was upgraded into Tropical Storm Warren by the JTWC, although post-storm analysis revealed that the depression actually became a tropical storm late on July 12. At 00:00 UTC on July 14, the JMA declared the system a tropical storm, with the JTWC upgrading Warren to a typhoon that evening.

Tracking west-northwestward while also accelerating, Warren continued to gradually deepen, and on the morning of July 15, the JMA designated Warren a severe tropical storm. Twenty-four hours later, the JMA upped Warren into a typhoon.

While tracking across the Philippine Sea, many tropical cyclone forecast models showed Warren tracking northward near Taiwan and eventually recurving out to sea. However, forecasters at the JTWC continued to predict a westward motion because satellite imagery and mid-level synoptic analysis showed a subtropical ridge to its north. According to the JTWC, the typhoon weakened slightly on July 17, though data from the JMA suggested that Warren maintained its maximum intensity until Warren skirted Luzon that evening. After entering the South China Sea, Warren made landfall near the city of Shantou on the morning of July 19. The storm rapidly weakened overland, and the storm dissipated on July 20 over the province of Guangdong.

Preparations and impact
The inner core of the typhoon brushed the northern Philippines, prompting flooding that resulted in the suspension of classes. Around 60 people fled their homes in Baguio. Somewhere in the northern portion of the country, a man was killed when his motorcycle skidded on a slippery road as he went to inspect storm damage. Approximately 1,600 families lost access to drinking water. A total of 3,560 homes were damaged and an additional 21,329 were destroyed, which resulted in 102,169 people or 19,224 families that either sought shelter or were homeless. Six people were killed in the country. The storm inflicted US$11.4 million in damage to the country, including $10.1 million from infrastructure.

Further north, in Hong Kong, a No 1. hurricane signal was issued on July 18. Later that day, the signal was increased to a No. 3 signal, but on July 20, all signals were dropped. North Point observed  of rain over a five-day period, including  in a 24-hour period. In Hong Kong, severe flooding occurred, especially in low-lying areas, several trees were downed, and five minor landslides were reported. Many village houses were submerged. In Sheung Shui, more than 20 people were stranded. In addition,  of agricultural land were also flooded, resulting in the drownings of 1,370 pigs and 133,000 poultry. Along the Tuen Mun Highway, a  tree collapsed, damaging a van and injuring two men. Seventeen flights were called off at the airport and ferry services to Tap Mun, Macau, and mainland China were suspended. Throughout Hong Kong, 12 people were injured and a 5-year-old boy was reported missing after falling into the sea at a local park.

Throughout Shantou, six people were killed and 106 people were injured. There,  of food were lost. About 4,500 houses and 14,000 huts collapsed, and 38,000 houses sustained damage. In addition, seven ships sunk and another 178 were damaged. Twenty-seven electricity sub-stations were destroyed and five hydroelectric power stations were damaged. In Jieyang, 749 power lines were downed. In Qiqihar, 14,000 structures were destroyed. However, the city of Canton, to the southwest of Shantou, was spared by the typhoon. Across Guangdong Province, power and phone service was knocked out for 24 hours. Province-wide, 13,000 homes were demolished, with 150,000 others damaged. According to press reports, 17 people were killed and 153 suffered injuries. Damage was estimated at $270 million, including $9.5 million from rice fields and $6 million from fruit trees.

See also

Tropical Storm Warren (1984)

Notes

References

External links
 Japan Meteorological Agency
 Joint Typhoon Warning Center 
 JMA Track

Warren
Warren
Warren
Warren
Warren